Rear Admiral (Junior Grade) Rendani Masutha is a retired South African naval officer, currently serving as Deputy Military Ombud.

She completed her law degree at the University of Venda and completed her LLB at the University of the North. She obtained an LL.M. from Unisa. She graduated from the Naval College in 1995, becoming the first black officer in the Navy and joined the Legal Office in Simon's Town.

She was appointed a military judge in 2005 and Senior Military Judge from 2006 to 2010.

She was promoted to rear admiral (jg) on 1 June 2011 and appointed Director Defence Legal Service and Director Military Defence Counsel.

She died on 23 June 2018.

References

South African admirals
Year of birth missing
2018 deaths
University of South Africa alumni
University of Limpopo alumni